Get Rich or Die Tryin is a 2005 American crime drama film written by Terence Winter and directed by Jim Sheridan. It stars
Curtis "50 Cent" Jackson in his feature film acting debut, alongside Terrence Howard, Joy Bryant, Bill Duke, Adewale Akinnuoye-Agbaje, Omar Benson Miller, Ashley Walters and Viola Davis. The film, which contains autobiographical elements from 50 Cent's life, follows his character, Marcus Greer, a drug dealer who turns away from his criminal life to pursue his passion of rap music. The film's title is shared with 50 Cent's 2003 debut album of the same name.

Plans for a film starring 50 Cent were revealed in 2004, following the success of the Get Rich or Die Tryin album. It was known during production as Locked and Loaded. Similar to the 2002  film 8 Mile starring Eminem, which it used as a template, the film took inspiration from 50 Cent's childhood experiences as a drug dealer. Filming began on April 11, 2005 and ended in June of that same year. The filming locations included New York City, Canada (in Toronto & Wasaga Beach) and Ireland (in Bray & Dublin).

Originally scheduled for a 2006 release, Get Rich or Die Tryin had its world premiere at the Grauman's Chinese Theater in Hollywood on November 2, 2005 and was released in the United States one week later. The film received generally negative reviews from critics and grossed $46.4 million at the box office on a budget of $40 million.

Plot 
Marcus is a quiet boy who adores his mother Katrina, and the two live a relatively comfortable life on her drug-dealing income. After Marcus writes a song for his love interest Charlene, her stepfather sends her away to live with her grandparents. Meanwhile, Marcus's mother is murdered, and Marcus has to live with his grandparents full-time. Marcus turns to selling drugs in order to buy new shoes, and as he grows older, he eventually abandons high school to sell drugs for local kingpin, Levar, and his underling, Majestic.

Years later, Marcus reunites with Charlene and the two become intimate. One of his close friends, Antwan, is shot and paralyzed at a club by a Colombian named Raul. In retaliation, Marcus attacks Raul, but stops short of murdering him and instead shoots Raul in the legs multiple times as payback for Antwan. When Raul refuses to identify Marcus as the shooter in a police line-up, he is allowed to go free. However, cops raid his house after an anonymous tip and find a gun and drugs. Marcus is sent to prison, where he befriends another inmate named Bama. Meanwhile, Majestic makes his move to seize control of the local drug trade. He sets Levar up to go to prison, and then frames Levar's second-in-command Odell for it. After publicly torturing and murdering Odell, Majestic then takes over Levar's empire as the new kingpin.

After encouragement from Bama, Marcus leaves the drug trade behind to pursue and fulfill his lifelong dream of being a rapper, calling himself Young Caesar, with Bama as his manager and producer. After Marcus gets out of prison, Majestic invites him to become his right-hand man, but Marcus tells him of his aspirations to being a rapper, which Majestic laughs off. Marcus leaves with Bama and takes Justice with him.

Justice and Bama initially have a clash of personalities, but Marcus calms them after a roadside stop. Unconvinced of Marcus's dream, Justice informs Majestic of his activities. As Marcus more seriously pursues music, Majestic uses threats and his power to try to stop his success. Marcus retaliates by taunting Majestic in his songs, and Majestic targets Marcus for death.

Despite Marcus's insistence at avoiding crime, Bama convinces him to carry out one last robbery on a Colombian safe house. After Marcus and his crew complete the robbery, Marcus is shot outside of his home by Justice, but is saved by his grandparents. After being hospitalized, he goes through a period of self-loathing and pity before reevaluating his life and prioritizing his family. After a long and painful recovery, he records music again.

Angered with Justice's failure to kill Marcus, Majestic kills Justice. Marcus meets with Levar in prison, who remorsefully reveals that he is Marcus's biological father and regrets not being there for him and his mother to protect them. 

At Marcus's concert debut, Majestic shows up with his goons and tries to intimidate Marcus as he goes on stage. Majestic reveals that he killed Marcus's mother years earlier for spurning his affections. Marcus attacks Majestic in rage but before he can kill Majestic, Bama persuades him to start the show, urging him think about his family. As Marcus starts to walk out on stage, Majestic tries to stab him, but Bama shoots Majestic. Majestic begs for Marcus to kill him, but Marcus refuses. As he walks out towards the crowd, Bama shoots Majestic again, killing him. Marcus steps onto the stage, removes his bulletproof vest and performs "Hustler's Ambition".

Cast

Soundtrack 

The soundtrack was released on November 8, 2005. In December 2005, the Recording Industry Association of America (RIAA) certified the album platinum. The album has so far sold over 3 million copies worldwide.

Controversy 
Samuel L. Jackson publicly turned down an offer to co-star in the film, citing that he did not want to lend credence to what he believed was an inexperienced and unproven actor. Film critic Roger Ebert wrote that Jackson may be "arguing against the anti-intellectual message that success for young black males is better sought in the worlds of rapping and sports than in the classroom." Jackson and 50 Cent later co-starred in the 2006 film Home of the Brave.

Reception 
Get Rich or Die Tryin holds a 16% approval rating at Rotten Tomatoes based upon 117 reviews. The site's critical consensus reads, "While it may be based upon 50 Cent's own life experiences, Get Rich or Die Tryin is too similar to many other rags-to-riches stories to resonate." Radio Times criticized the film, saying that "as a vehicle for hip-hop superstar Curtis '50 Cent' Jackson, this [film] runs out of gas a fair few kilometres short", giving it a "could be worse" rating of 2/5 stars. CinePassion stated that "[Jim] Sheridan's surface vividness is applied around a vacuum."

FilmFocus said that the film's "real danger is that it sets a precedent for the director; if the price is right he's on board". The BBC was not entirely impressed with the film, saying that "while it boasts a first-class director and is loosely based on the rapper's own life-story, the results leave you feeling a little short-changed".

Jonathan Ross gave a positive review, calling Get Rich or Die Tryin "gripping" and suggesting that it had "excellent performances". Roger Ebert also praised the film, giving the film a 3 out of 4 rating and saying that it was "a film with a rich and convincing texture, a drama with power and anger".

In retrospect, director Jim Sheridan, said: “Get Rich came out the wrong way. I thought 'I can do this.' I'm there directing 50 Cent and he's looking blank, and I'm thinking 'this is great. The American audience will get this. When they look at John Wayne and his face is blank, they know exactly what he's thinking. So I'm thinking 'this is like John Wayne.' I was wrong.“ He also added: "When you look at 50 Cent and his face is blank you go 'what ... is he thinking?' He's not John Wayne. My empathy tripped me up. I got it, so I assumed the audience would. They didn't."

Audiences polled by CinemaScore gave the film an average grade "A−" on an A+ to F scale.

Get Rich or Die Tryin grossed $12,020,807 in its opening weekend. Altogether, the film grossed $46,442,528 in total worldwide.

Home media
Get Rich or Die Tryin was first released on DVD on March 28, 2006. It was later released on Blu-ray.

See also
 8 Mile
 Notorious
 All Eyez on Me
  List of hood films

References

External links 
 
 
 

2005 films
2005 crime drama films
American coming-of-age films
American crime drama films
2000s English-language films
Films about African-American organized crime
Films scored by Quincy Jones
Films directed by Jim Sheridan
Films set in New York City
2000s hip hop films
Hood films
MTV Films films
Paramount Pictures films
African-American films
African-American biographical dramas
2000s American films